Fabienne Demal (born 15 February 1968), better known by her stage name Axelle Red, is a Belgian singer-songwriter. She has released 11 albums, including Sans plus attendre, À Tâtons, Toujours Moi and Jardin Secret; she is best known for her 1993 single "Sensualité", a hit in France in 1994.

Biography
Axelle Red was born as Fabienne Demal on 15 February 1968 in Hasselt, Flanders, Belgium, the daughter of Roland Demal, a solicitor in Hasselt and a councillor for the Flemish Liberals and Democrats (VLD) in the City Council.
She has lived in Paris and currently lives in a village near Brussels.

In 1983, aged 14, Fabienne Demal produced her first single, "Little Girls", using the artist name Fabby. In 1986, she chose the artist name Axelle Red in tribute to the singer of group Guns N'Roses called Axl Rose. She graduated from the Vrije Universiteit Brussel (VUB) as a lawyer in 1993; in the same year her first album Sans Plus Attendre was released which immediately resulted in her artistic break out in France, Switzerland, Canada and Belgium, where sales alone amounted to more than 200,000.

Axelle received an International Federation of the Phonographic Industry platinum award for sales of more than 1 million; a year later she sold out the Paris Olympia for the first time.

Since 1997, Axelle has been an ambassador for the United Nations Children's Fund (UNICEF) standing up for the rights of children and women in war-torn regions and developing countries. That same year she devoted herself to the Ottawa Convention against land mines and in the poverty-stricken Haiti.

In 1998, Axelle married Filip Vanes (still her husband and manager at Music & Roses). She also sang the official anthem, "La Cour des Grands", with Youssou N'Dour at the opening ceremony of the 1998 FIFA World Cup in the Stade de France outside Paris, before a television audience of over a billion people. Seven months pregnant with her daughter, Janelle, in her shows devoted to soul and rhythm and blues she was joined by her heroes, Wilson Pickett, Sam Moore, Eddy Floyd, Percy Sledge and Ann Peebles. Axelle supported Amnesty International's grand benefit concert in Paris although, under doctor's orders, 7 months pregnant, she was advised not to perform herself. That same year saw the release of her Spanish album, Con Solo Pensarlo.

In 1999, Axelle received the most important music award in France for female artist of the year, the Victoire de la Musique, while her third studio album, Toujours Moi, was also released, written and produced by herself. It sold more than 800,000 albums.

In 2002, her fourth studio album, Face A / Face B, was released. The title refers to the vinyl records from the sixties labelled "fast and slow" side (an up-tempo side for dancing and a ballad side for slows). It was a co-production with producer Al Stone.

In 2003, her second daughter, Gloria, was born. A CD box was also released comprising three CDs with numerous previously unreleased tracks such as duets with Charles Aznavour, Francis Cabrel, Stephan Eicher, Sylvie Vartan, Arno and Tom Barman. Her duet with Renaud, "Manhattan-Kaboul", had the most airplay in France that year and notched up sales of more than 800,000 singles, for which Axelle and Renaud received an NRJ music award at Midem in Cannes.

In 2004, Axelle made her acting debut in Rudolf Mestdagh's film Ellektra.

After being forced to flee the riots in June 2004 in the Democratic Republic of the Congo, Axelle campaigned in July of that year in Niger with UNICEF against female circumcision and child marriages. French Soul, her first 'Best Of' compilation, was released with two previously unreleased songs "I Have A Dream" and "J'ai Fait Un Rêve", an homage to Martin Luther King Jr. Axelle directed the two videos herself. Pregnant from a third daughter, Billie, she ended the year with a lightning visit to Sri Lanka with UNICEF emergency aid for the people who had been hit so badly by the tsunami.

In 2005, Axelle travelled to the north of Senegal for the French Oxfam/Agir Ici's campaign, "Make noise till Hong Kong". She spoke up for honest trade prices. In May, she joined Peter Gabriel and Youssou N'Dour at the Geneva concert on the occasion of the 60th anniversary of the United Nations, at which Axelle is thanked by Kofi Annan for her humanitarian work with the various NGOs. Together with Bob Geldof, she is also the spokesperson for Live 8 in France and performed on 2 July 2005 at the Palace of Versailles in front of 200,000 people during the benefit. At the European summit, Axelle officially asked José Manuel Barroso, chairman of the European Commission, to increase the budget for the development of the Third World countries.

2006 saw the release of Jardin Secret, Axelle's fifth studio album. The tracks were recorded in Willie Mitchell's Royal Studios in Memphis. In September 2006, Axelle received the highest artistic honour, becoming Chevalier dans l'Ordre des Arts et des Lettres, presented to her by the French Minister of culture, Renaud Donnedieu de Vabres. She also took part in the 0110 concerts against intolerance and racism in Antwerp and Brussels.

In 2007 Axelle visited poverty-stricken Sierra Leone for the UNICEF campaign "Together, saving 4 million babies", five years after the civil war. Sierra Leone has the largest child mortality in the world. In March 2007, Axelle spoke at the FIFDH (International Film Festival and Forum on Human Rights) in Geneva together with the Cambodian director, Rithy Panh, during a debate on prostitution. In December 2007, King Albert II presented her with the medal of Commandeur in de Kroonorde for her social commitment.

In May 2008, the University of Hasselt awarded Axelle the honorary title of Doctor Honoris Causa for her social commitment as an artist and human rights' activist. On the occasion of International Women's Day, Axelle was guest speaker at the Council of Europe during a debate on domestic violence. She also wrote her first album in English, Sisters & Empathy, and recorded it with her regular musicians, Michael Toles and Lester Snell from Memphis and Jeff Anderson and Damon Duewhite from New York City.

Discography

 Sans plus attendre (1993)
 À Tâtons (1996)
 Con solo pensarlo (1998)
 Toujours Moi (1999)
 Alive (in concert) (2000)
 Face A / Face B (2002)
 Jardin Secret (2006)
 Sisters & Empathy (2008)
 Un coeur comme le mien (2011)
 Rouge Ardent (2013)
 Exil (2018)
 The Christmas Album (2022)

Awards 
 Victoires de la musique:
 Female artist of the year (1999)
 Original song of the year (2003) for "Manhattan-Kaboul" with Renaud (lyrics by Renaud Séchan; composer and arranger: Jean-Pierre Bucolo)
 NRJ's NRJ Music Awards:
 Best French song (2003) for "Manhattan-Kaboul" with Renaud
 Best French duo (2003) with Renaud

External links 
 
 
 Respect to Axelle : French unofficial website
 Biography of Axelle Red, from Radio France Internationale

References

1968 births
Belgian women singers
English-language singers from Belgium
French-language singers of Belgium
Spanish-language singers of Belgium
Vrije Universiteit Brussel alumni
Living people
People from Hasselt
People from Uccle